Exophiala is a genus of anamorphic fungi in the family Herpotrichiellaceae. The widespread genus contains 28 species. The genus was formally described by J. W. Carmichael in 1966.

Exophiala has been implicated in causing 'saxophone lung' or hypersensitivity pneumonitis, a disease that can be contracted by woodwind instrumentalists (saxophonists, clarinettists, oboists, etc.). A case study presented at the annual meeting of the American College of Allergy, Asthma and Immunology highlighted that it is possible to develop this allergic pulmonary disease through improper cleaning of instruments.

Exophiala werneckii is the organism responsible for tinea nigra.

Some sources equate Hortaea werneckii, Cladosporium werneckii, Exophiala werneckii, and Phaeoannellomyces werneckii.

Exophiala jeanselmei causes maduromycosis. This is usually an asymptomatic disease which presents with black or brown macular lesions which enlarge by peripheral extension. The lesion is darkest at the periphery and has very distinct margins. Lab diagnosis- using a KOH mount. Typically seen is brown septate branching hyphae or dark brown budding cells. Treatment is topical antifungal: miconazole or econazole.

Species
Exophiala alcalophila
Exophiala angulospora
Exophiala attenuata
Exophiala calicioides
Exophiala castellanii
Exophiala dermatitidis
Exophiala dopicola
Exophiala exophialae
Exophiala heteromorpha
Exophiala hongkongensis
Exophiala jeanselmei
Exophiala lecanii-corni
Exophiala mansonii
Exophiala mesophila
Exophiala moniliae
Exophiala negronii
Exophiala phaeomuriformis
Exophiala pisciphila
Exophiala psychrophila
Exophiala salmonis
Exophiala spinifera
Exophiala werneckii

References

Fungal plant pathogens and diseases
Eurotiomycetes genera
Taxa described in 1966
Eurotiomycetes